Christopher Apple House, also known as the Apple Farm House, is a historic home located in Lawrence Township, Marion County, Indiana.  It was built in 1859, and is a two-story, four bay Federal style brick dwelling with Greek Revival style design elements.  It has a side gable roof and -story rear wing.

It was added to the National Register of Historic Places in 1980.

References

External links

Houses on the National Register of Historic Places in Indiana
Federal architecture in Indiana
Greek Revival houses in Indiana
Houses completed in 1859
Houses in Marion County, Indiana
National Register of Historic Places in Marion County, Indiana
National Register of Historic Places in Indianapolis